Argyrodes scintillulanus, is a species of spider of the genus Argyrodes. It is native to India and Sri Lanka.

See also
 List of Theridiidae species

References

Theridiidae
Spiders of the Indian subcontinent
Spiders of Africa
Spiders described in 1880